Anna Kalashnikova  (born ) is a retired Ukrainian female volleyball player. She was part of the Ukraine women's national volleyball team.

She participated in the 1994 FIVB Volleyball Women's World Championship.
 On club level she played with Orbita Zaporizhya.

Clubs
 Orbita Zaporizhya (1994)

References

1972 births
Living people
Ukrainian women's volleyball players
Place of birth missing (living people)